"Birth" was a major charting hit for English group, The Peddlers in 1969.

Background
The song written by Roy Phillips and released on CBS 4449. It was referred to as a stunningly innovative composition by The Guinness Encyclopedia of Popular Music.  It is from their 1969 album, Birthday which also contains the follow up hit "Girlie".

Chart performance
"Birth" reached No. 17 in the UK on September 20, 1969, during a nine-week run in the chart. The song peaked in Australia at No. 41.

Other versions
English group, Barron Knights covered the song and it appears on their 1973, Barron Knights album.

References

External links
 thepeddlers.co.uk: Birth NME Chart 4 October 1969 & lyrics

1969 singles
1969 songs
The Peddlers songs
Songs written by Roy Phillips
CBS Records singles